The Pause is a 2015 novel by Australian author John Larkin. It looks deep at the devastating impact of teenage suicide, and how it affects the people around them. It is a personal narrative of its main character Declan O’Malley, describing his life following an attempted suicide after his love interest Lisa is forced to move to Honk-Kong by her abusive mother.

The book won the 2015 Queensland Literary Award.

Synopsis
The book is a first-person reflective narrative of the main character Declan O’Malley who commits suicide after his girlfriend Lisa is forcefully relocated to Honk-Kong after their relationship is discovered by her mother referred to as the Kraken. He commits suicide via jumping onto the way of an oncoming train but is forced to observe an alternate reality where he survived his suicide attempt and recovered from depression.

Reception
The book received a positive response with a 4.1 rating on Goodreads and 2015 Queensland Literary Award.

References

2015 Australian novels
Fiction about suicide
Random House books
2. "The Pause." Goodreads. N.p., n.d. Web. 10 March 2016.